Disney Sing It: Family Hits is a karaoke video game developed by Zoë Mode and published by Disney Interactive Studios for the PlayStation 3 and Wii.

It's the sixth and final instalment in the Disney Sing It series. The game features songs from Disney and Pixar animated movies like Beauty and the Beast, Cars, Toy Story, The Lion King and The Little Mermaid.

It's the first and only game in the series that is not focused on Disney-affiliated artists or Disney Channel productions.

Songs 
Disney Sing It: Family Hits features songs used in Disney animated movies as well as some songs featured in Pixar movies.

Track list

The track list for Family Hits consists of a mix between Pixar movies, like Toy Story and Cars, and Disney Originals like The Lion King and The Little Mermaid. There is a difference in track listing between the United States and European version of the game.

See also
High School Musical: Sing It!
Disney Sing It
Disney Sing It! – High School Musical 3: Senior Year
Disney Sing It: Pop Hits
Disney Sing It: Party Hits

External links 
 Sing It Official mini-site
 Gamezone

2010 video games
Disney video games
Sing It!
Karaoke video games
PlayStation 3 games
Wii games
Toy Story video games
Video games developed in the United Kingdom
Multiplayer and single-player video games
Zoë Mode games